Yehoshua (Shuka) Dorfman (1950 - 31 July 2014) was an Israeli military officer and the Director General of the Israel Antiquities Authority (IAA).

Career 
Dorfman had practically no formal archaeological training, his academic training being in Political Science, which he studied at Haifa University. He served in a number of military positions, reaching the rank of Brigadier General. He saw combat in the War of Attrition, the Lebanon War and the Yom Kippur War. As chief artillery officer, he commanded the artillery corps during the Operation Accountability attack against Lebanon. He retired from the IDF in 2000.

Dorfman headed the IAA for almost 15 years, from November 2000 until his death in 2014, his tenure as director general having been extended twice. During his time as director, the organization expanded the scope of archaeological rescue excavations of sites threatened by land development and construction. He promoted conservation efforts and the development of excavated sites for public access. The director advocated for the use of advanced technology in the field and helped accelerate its implementation in research and conservation. He stressed the archaeological importance of the Dead Sea Scrolls, and under his tenure, they were digitized and made accessible to the public.

Death 
After a long battle with illness, Dorfman died on 31 July 2014. He left behind a wife, Talma, and three sons. He was laid to rest in Gedera.

Bibliography 

 מתחת לפני השטח: יחסי הגומלין בין פוליטיקה לארכיאולוגיה בישראל (Below the Surface: The Interaction Between Politics and Archeology in Israel)

References 

1950 births
2014 deaths
Israel Antiquities Authority
University of Haifa alumni
Israeli military personnel

he:יהושע דורפמן